Rostam Kola (also Romanized as Rostam Kolā) is a village in Nowkand Kola Rural District, in the Central District of Qaem Shahr County, Mazandaran Province, Iran. At the 2006 census, its population was 478, in 124 families.

References 

Populated places in Qaem Shahr County